The City of Culture of Galicia ( or simply Cidade da Cultura) is a complex of cultural buildings in Santiago de Compostela, Province of A Coruña, Galicia, Spain, designed by a group of architects led by Peter Eisenman. Construction was challenging and expensive  as the design of the buildings involves high degree contours, meant to make the buildings look like rolling hills. Nearly every window of the thousands that are part of the external façade has its own custom shape.  In 2013 it was announced that after more than a decade, construction of the project would be halted.  The International Art Center and Music and Scenic Arts Center will not be built.

In February 1999 the Parliament of Galicia held an international design competition for a cultural center on Mount Gaiás. The entrants were Ricardo Bofill, Manuel Gallego Jorreto, Annette Gigon and Mike Guyer, Steven Holl, Rem Koolhaas, Daniel Libeskind, Juan Navarro Baldeweg, Jean Nouvel, Dominique Perrault, Cesar Portela, Santiago Calatrava, who later withdrew his proposal, and Eisenman, whose proposal was selected for both conceptual uniqueness and exceptional harmony with the place.

The concept of the project is a new peak on Monte Gaiás, made up of a stony crust reminiscent of an archaeological site divided by natural breaks that resemble scallops, the traditional symbol of Compostela.

The building site has also become the base for the development of a public transparency urban experiment by the Spanish architect and artist Andrés Jaque. With Jaque's 12 Actions to Make the Cidade da Cultura Transparent, the building site was equipped with devices that make the political implications and ecological extension of the construction works understandable for the general public.

The project has more than doubled its original budget and has not attracted significant numbers of visitors (becoming a white elephant for subsequent governments and taxpayers).  Construction of the final two planned buildings was stopped in 2012 and terminated definitively in March 2013 following high cost overruns.

Notes

References
 Codex: The City of Culture of Galicia. Eisenman Architects. Monacelli Press 2005.

External links

 Official City of Culture of Galicia website—
 Spain's extravagant City of Culture opens amid criticism. 2011-01-11
 Article discussing the decision to stop the project (Spanish)
 BBC Spain in crisis: Broken visions dot Galicia's landscape
 Official Government presentation
 Fragments of a program critic about the spending on Cidade da Cultura: Part 1 (11:28)(Same fragment, Entering the CC (first 5:40)), Part 2 (13:38)

Arts centres in Spain
Buildings and structures in Santiago de Compostela
Art museums and galleries in Spain
Museums in Galicia (Spain)
Tourist attractions in Galicia (Spain)
Peter Eisenman buildings and structures
Modernist architecture in Spain